Mannat (Eng: Wish) is a Punjabi Film directed by Gurbir Singh Grewal. This movie is produced by famous Bollywood producer, Anuradha Prasad. Film is distributed by B.A.G. Films.
It was released in October 2006. It stars Jimmy Sheirgill, Kulraj Randhawa, Manav Vij and Kanwaljit Singh. It was debut film of Kulraj Randhawa, a famous TV actress and it is the second Punjabi Film of Jimmy Shergill, after Yaaran naal baharan.

Plot overview
During the year 1985, reminiscent of an era of turmoil in Punjab, an army officer (Nihal Singh) falls in love with a local village girl named Prasinn Kaur. Their romance ultimately leads to a marriage but the fate has tragedy in store for them. Nihal's unit is dispatched to Siachen Glacier and he has to leave his pregnant wife under the care of a couple who are his neighbours. However, due to an unfortunate incident, Prasinn dies after giving birth to a baby girl. Her neighbour, who is desperate to become a mother steals the child. From here the misery of the army officer starts. A twist in the story sends him to prison for serving a life term. After completing the sentence his search for his daughter starts again. This story is all about love, passion, hatred, betrayal and romance. Motivated from a true incident, which the director came across in 1996, the film brings out various facts of human behavior in a true Punjabi flavour and spirit.

Music
The songs of the movie 'Mannat' are quite hit in Punjab. Songs are Pani Diyaan Challan and
Umran Di Sanjh. Songs are sung by Playback Singer Feroz Khan, Alka Yagnik, Rani Randeep, Shafqat Ali Khan, Arvinder Singh, Simarjit Kumar and Bhupinder Singh.

External links
Mannat's Official Web-site

2006 films
Films scored by Jaidev Kumar
Punjabi-language Indian films
2000s Punjabi-language films